Cephus is a genus of insects belonging to the family Cephidae.

The genus was first described by Latreille in 1802.

The species of this genus are found in Europe and North America.

Species
The following species are recognised in the genus Cephus:
 
 Cephus berytensis (Pic, 1916)
 Cephus brachycercus Thomson, 1871
 Cephus cinctus Norton
 Cephus citriniventris Pic, 1917
 Cephus daghestanicus (Dovnar-Zapolskij, 1931)
 Cephus excisus (Dovnar-Zapolskij, 1931)
 Cephus fumipennis Eversmann, 1847
 Cephus gaullei Konow, 1896
 Cephus gracilicornis Konow, 1896
 Cephus gracilis Costa, 1860
 Cephus infuscatus Thomson, 1871
 Cephus lateralis Konow, 1894
 Cephus luteonotatus Pic, 1918
 Cephus maroccanus Lacourt, 1995
 Cephus nigricarpus André, 1881
 Cephus nigrinus Thomson, 1871
 Cephus notatus Kokujev, 1910
 Cephus obscuriventris Pic, 1918
 Cephus parvus (Dovnar-Zapolskij, 1931)
 Cephus politissimus Costa, 1888
 Cephus pseudopilosulus Dovnar-Zapolskij, 1926
 Cephus pulcher Tischbein, 1852
 Cephus pygmeus (Linnaeus, 1767)
 Cephus rjabovi Dovnar-Zapolskij, 1926
 Cephus runcator Konow, 1896
 Cephus sareptanus Dovnar-Zapolskij, 1928
 Cephus spinipes (Panzer, 1800)
 Cephus zahaikevitshi (Ermolenko, 1971)

References

Cephidae
Sawfly genera